Enoch Erskine "Ginger" Shinault (September 7, 1892 – December 29, 1930) was a Major League Baseball catcher who played for two seasons. He played for the Cleveland Indians from 1921 to 1922, playing in 35 career games.

External links

1892 births
1930 deaths
Major League Baseball catchers
Cleveland Indians players
Baseball players from Arkansas